Francis LaVern Messerly (April 21, 1914 – October 8, 1994) was an American politician who served in the Iowa House of Representatives from 1961 to 1965 and in the Iowa Senate 1965 to 1973.

He died on October 8, 1994, in Cedar Falls, Iowa at age 80.

References

1914 births
1994 deaths
Republican Party members of the Iowa House of Representatives
Republican Party Iowa state senators
20th-century American politicians